Rubus hawaiensis, also called the Ākala, is one of two species (with R. macraei) commonly known as Hawaiian raspberry, endemic to Hawaii. In most areas it is not very common, but in some places (such as the upper Koolau Gap in Haleakalā and Laupāhoehoe Natural Area Reserve) it can be a dominant member of the understory vegetation. Although superficially similar to the other Hawaiian species, Rubus macraei, the two are believed to be derived from separate dispersals to Hawaii.

Description
The leaves are compound, with three leaflets.

Although frequently described as prickle-free ("thornless"), and often used as an example of loss of defenses in island plants, most plants do have thin prickles at least when small. As the cane grows the outer layer of bark usually sheds, taking the prickles with it. Interest in breeding "thornless" varieties of edible raspberries (possibly even with distantly related species since most Rubus readily hybridize) has led to the introduction of several species of continental Rubus species which have since escape cultivation and become serious pests.  These include the yellow Himalayan raspberry, Rubus ellipticus, and the Florida prickly blackberry, R. penetrans (R. argutus).

Impact
The presence of invasive alien Rubus species along with two native species has led to a debate on biological control. Specifically, whether an agent that might be able to control the alien species should be released even if it may have serious impacts on the native species, if the latter are not part of a major evolutionary diversification and not a major part of most ecosystems.  Some would argue that it is worth sacrificing a small component in order to save the whole ecosystem, while others say that humans should not be multiplying the damage they have already caused by introducing the aliens.

Mythology
This berry is believed to be the land counterpart to the limu kala both appearing in the first period of creation (wā) as mentioned in the Kumulipo.

References

External links

 Hawaiian Native Plant Genera - Rubus Photographs of R. hawaiensis.

hawaiensis
Endemic flora of Hawaii
Biota of Hawaii (island)
Biota of Lanai
Biota of Maui
Biota of Molokai
~
Plants described in 1858
Flora without expected TNC conservation status